The Carthage Administration Inscription is an inscription in the Punic language, using the Phoenician alphabet, discovered on the archaeological site of Carthage in the 1960s and preserved in the National Museum of Carthage. It is known as KAI 303.

Found among elements of the Roman period, this inscription is key for the knowledge of the institutions and town planning of Carthage during the Punic period; it refers to magistrates and a sector of the population, corporations and craftsmen.

Its dating varies according to scholars, ranging from the fourth to the second century BC. The text describes works carried out in the city but their exact nature is not established with certainty because of the difficulty of reading the Phoenician language and the gaps in the document.

Discovery 
It was mixed upon its discovery with rubble from a late Roman construction, "in a layer of embankments covering a 4th-century AD mosaic pavement", and has therefore not been found in situ.

The inscription

{|
|+ 
|-
| 1 || ptḥ wpʿl ʾyt hḥṣ z lmqm šʿr hḥdš ʾš kn bḥ[mt drm ʿm qrtḥdšt bšt] || Opened and made was this street, in the direction of the place of the new door which is found on the wa[ll to the south, (by the) people of Carthage, in the year]
|-
| 2 || špṭm špṭ wʾdnbʿl ʿtr ʾdnbʿl bn ʾšmnḥlṣ bn b[...... w...... bn bdml-] || of the sufetes Šafat and Adonibaal, at the time of the magistracy? of Adonibaal, son of Eshmunhilles, son of B[... and... son of Bodmel-]
|-
| 3 || -qrt bn ḥnʾ wḥbrnm ṭnʾm ʿl mmlkt z ʿbdmlqrt [bn ...... bn ... bʿl ḥrš] || -qart, son of Hanno, and his comrades. Assigned to this work are: Abd-Melqart [son of... son of... master craftsman;]
|-
| 4 || bdmlqrt bn bʿlḥnʾ bn bdmlqrt pls yhwʾln ʾ(ḥ?) [bdmlqrt ḥṣb wʿml by kl] || Bodmelqart, son of Baalhanno, son of Bodmelqart, leveler; Yaḥaw'ilon, brother? of [Bodmelqart, stonecutter; and for this worked all] 
|-
| 5 || sḥrt nst hmksʾm ʾš bʿmq qrt šql mḥtt wʾš ʾ(y?)[ ksp wʾy ḥrṣ lm wʾp] || merchants, porters, the packers that are in the plain of the city, shekel-weighers and (those) that ha[ve? no money, nor gold, and also (those)]
|-
| 6 || ʾš lm nsk ḥrṣ wmʾnnm wbt tnrm wpʿl sdlm ʾhdy (w?)[ʾm ymḥ ʾš ʾyt hspr z] || that have (money and gold), the gold founders, the vase artisans, and those of the kiln workshops, and the sandal makers, together. And? [if someone erases this inscription]
|-
| 7 || wʿnš hmḥšbm ʾš ln ʾyt hʾdm hʾ ksp ʾlp|lp ʿl mn(m?) [X bmḥr hspr]. || our accountants will punish that man with a fine of 1,000 (shekels) of silver, also mina(s?) [X, for the price of the inscription.] 
|}

Dupont-Sommer distinguishes four parts in the inscription: the first concerns the evocation of the works that took place in the Punic city. The second is the enumeration of the conductors of these municipal works. In the third sentence are cited various trades involved in the work undertaken. Finally, the listing ends with a threat against anyone who would harm the listing.

References

Bibliography

General overview

Works on Carthaginian Punic 
  
 
 
  
  
  
  
 Maurice Sznycer, « Carthage et la civilisation punique », dans Claude Nicolet, Rome et la conquête du monde méditerranéen, vol. 2 : Genèse d'un empire, Paris, Presses universitaires de France, 2001, p. 545-593

Inscription specific 
  
 
 

Carthage
Punic inscriptions